Togo Brava Suite is an album by the American pianist, composer, and bandleader Duke Ellington. It was recorded in England and released by United Artists Records in 1971. The album won a Grammy Award for Best Jazz Performance by a Big Band in 1972. The album was later reissued on CD by Blue Note in 1994, and studio recordings of the complete "Togo Brava Suite" were released in 2001 by Storyville.

Reception
The AllMusic review by Scott Yanow stated: "By the time of these concerts from England, the Duke Ellington Orchestra had suffered quite a few losses of veteran personnel... However, the band was still a major force, and this set has plenty of highpoints".

Track listing
All compositions by Duke Ellington except where noted.
 "C Jam Blues" (Barney Bigard, Duke Ellington) – 4:42
 "Toga Brava Suite: Soul Soothing Beach/Naturellement" – 11:56
 "Right on Togo" – 4:58
 "Happy Reunion" – 4:41
 "Addi" – 4:04
 "Lotus Blossom" (Billy Strayhorn) – 2:30
 "Cotton Tail" – 4:18
 "Checkered Hat" (Judy Spencer, Norris Turney) – 4:37
 "La Plus Belle Africaine" – 8:39
 "In a Mellow Tone" (Ellington, Milt Gabler) – 4:02
 "I Got It Bad (and That Ain't Good)" (Ellington, Paul Francis Webster) – 5:29
 "Melancholia" – 3:41
 "Soul Flute" – 3:19

 Recorded at the Birmingham Theatre in Birmingham, England on October 24, 1971 except for tracks 1 & 7 which were recorded at Colston Hall in Bristol, England on October 22, 1971.

Personnel
 Duke Ellington – piano
 Johnny Coles, Mercer Ellington, Money Johnson, Cootie Williams – trumpet
 Malcolm Taylor, Booty Wood – trombone
 Chuck Connors – bass trombone
 Jimmy Hamilton, Harold Ashby – tenor saxophone, clarinet
 Norris Turney – alto saxophone
 Harold Minerve, Russell Procope – alto saxophone, clarinet
 Paul Gonsalves – tenor saxophone
 Harry Carney – baritone saxophone
 Wild Bill Davis – organ
 Joe Benjamin – double bass
 Rufus "Speedy" Jones – drums

References

1971 live albums
United Artists Records live albums
Duke Ellington live albums
Grammy Award for Best Large Jazz Ensemble Album